Guru's Jazzmatazz, Vol. 4: The Hip Hop Jazz Messenger: Back to the Future is the sixth solo studio album by American hip hop musician Guru. It was released on July 31, 2007 via 7 Grand Records, making it the fourth and final installment in the rapper's Jazzmatazz series. Production was handled entirely by Solar, who also served as executive producer together with Guru. It features guest appearances from Blackalicious, Bobby Valentino, Bob James, Caron Wheeler, Common, Damian Marley, David Sanborn, Dionne Farris, Kem, Brownman Ali, Omar, Raheem DeVaughn, Ronnie Laws, Shelley Harland and Vivian Green.

A video for the song "State of Clarity" includes clips from the movie Fritz the Cat.

Track listing

Charts

References

External links

2007 albums
Sequel albums
Guru (rapper) albums